Antonina Valeriyivna Khyzhniak (born 28 July 1990) is a Ukrainian actress.

Biography
Khyzhniak was born on 28 July 1990 in the city of Ukrainka in Kyiv Oblast. In 2012, she graduated from the Kyiv National I. K. Karpenko-Kary Theatre, Cinema and Television University. After her studies, Khizhnyak worked at the Kyiv Academic Puppet Theatre. She has dubbed and voiced in Ukrainian and is the official Ukrainian voice of Daisy Ridley and Alicia Vikander. On 2 March 2020, the premiere of the television series "To Catch the Kaidash" took place, in which Khyzhniak played Motrya Kaidash.

Khyzhniak is divorced and has a son.

References

External links 
 

1990 births
Living people
People from Kyiv Oblast
Ukrainian film actresses
Ukrainian television actresses
Ukrainian voice actresses
21st-century Ukrainian actresses